Fesenkov Astrophysical Institute (Астрофизический институт имени В. Г. Фесенкова, АФИФ), or FAI, is a research institute in Almaty, Kazakhstan. The institute was founded in 1941 as the Institute for Astronomy and Physics of the Kazakh branch of the USSR Academy of Sciences, when a group of Soviet astronomers was evacuated during World War II from the European parts of the USSR to Almaty. In 1948 G.A. Tikhov had organized an independent sector of astrobotany, and in 1950 astronomers established the Astrophysical Institute of the Kazakh SSR. In 1989 the institute was renamed after Vasily Fesenkov, one of its founders.

FAI conducts both observational and theoretical research. The prime objects of observations are the Sun, outer planets, comets, Herbig Ae/Be stars, and active galaxies. The topics of theoretical research include stellar dynamics and computational astrophysics, active galactic nuclei, cosmology, physics of comets and interstellar medium. The institute runs three observational bases in mountains near Almaty: Kamenskoe Plateau Observatory, Assy-Turgen Observatory and Tien Shan Astronomical Observatory.

FAI is a member of the International Astronomical Union.

Interesting facts 
 The comet 67P/Churyumov–Gerasimenko, famous for the Rosetta mission, was discovered at Fesenkov Astrophysical Institute.
 FAI was one of the first institutions where a new branch of science—astrobiology—was born in the middle of the twentieth century.

References

External links 
 Homepage of Fesenkov Astrophysical Institute

Astrophysics institutes
Almaty
Research institutes in the Soviet Union
Research institutes in Kazakhstan
Research institutes established in 1941
1941 establishments in the Kazakh Soviet Socialist Republic
Astronomy in the Soviet Union